Matches 'n Mates was an American syndicated game show created and produced by Nick Nicholson and E. Roger Muir that aired from 1967–1968, and was taped at both WJW-TV in Cleveland, Ohio and WAGA-TV in Atlanta, Georgia. It was a Nicholson-Muir Production in association with 20th Century Fox Television.

The show was hosted by Art James, with Dave Michaels and Bob McClain announcing.

Matches 'n Mates was a word game in which two Husband and Wife teams attempted to match questions to answers in order to reveal letters of a mystery word called the "Hidden Item".

Gameplay
One member of each couple, in turn, calls out a letter between "A" and "I" and an incomplete statement was read ("To paint a fence you would use..."). The other member called out one of twelve numbers, each representing a different answer. If the statement and answer matched, a letter or space was revealed on the nine-space Hidden Item Board. The first team to identify a Hidden Item won the round, and the first team to win three rounds won the game and a bonus prize.

References

External links
 
 Matches 'n Mates photograph with host Art James

1960s American game shows
1967 American television series debuts
1968 American television series endings
Television in Cleveland
Television series by 20th Century Fox Television
Television series by Nicholson-Muir Productions